The Spanish Women's Open (in Spanish:  Open de España Femenino) is a professional golf tournament that has been part of the Ladies European Tour schedule since 2002.  It is the national championship of Spain in golf.

Between 1982 and 1996 there were several unofficial editions of the tournament.

Winners

References

External links
Ladies European Tour
Real Club de Golf Guadalmina

Spanish Open
Golf tournaments in Spain